The following is a list of important sites of interest and annual events in and around the city of Indianapolis.



A
 Athenæum (Das Deutsche Haus)

B
 Beef & Boards Dinner Theatre
 Benjamin Harrison Presidential Site
 Benton House
 Big Ten Football Championship Game
 Bona Thompson Memorial Center
 Broad Ripple Village (official cultural district)
 Broad Ripple Park Carousel
 Brookside Park
 Butler University

C

 The Cabaret
 Castleton Square
 The Children's Museum of Indianapolis
 Chris Gonzalez Collection
 Circle Centre
 Circle City Classic
 City-County Building Observation Deck
 City Market
 Clowes Memorial Hall
 Colonel Eli Lilly Civil War Museum
 Crispus Attucks Museum
 Crossroads Classic
 Crown Hill Cemetery
 List of public art in Crown Hill Cemetery
 Crown Hill National Cemetery

D
Depew Memorial Fountain
Drum Corps International World Class Championship

E
 Eagle Creek Park
 Eiteljorg Museum of American Indians and Western Art
 The Emerson Theater
 Epilogue Players

F
 Fall Creek Greenway
 FDIC International
 The Fashion Mall at Keystone
 Fort Harrison State Park
 Fountain Square (official cultural district)

G
 G. C. Murphy Building
 GMR Grand Prix
 Gainbridge Fieldhouse
 Garfield Park
 Gen Con
 Glendale Town Center
 Grand Prix of Indianapolis (Indy Lights)

H
 Harrison Center
 Heartland International Film Festival
 Hilbert Circle Theatre
 Hinkle Fieldhouse
 Historic Irvington Halloween Festival
 Holcomb Observatory and Planetarium

I

 The Idle
 InConJunction
 Indiana 9/11 Memorial
 Indiana Avenue (official cultural district)
 Indiana Black Expo
 Indiana Central Canal
 Indiana Convention Center
 Indiana Farmers Coliseum
 Indiana Historical Society
 Indiana Landmarks Center
 Indiana Medical History Museum
 Indiana Repertory Theatre
 Indiana Statehouse
 Indiana Statehouse Public Art Collection
 List of public art at the Indiana Statehouse
 Indiana State Fair
 Indiana State Library and Historical Bureau
 Indiana State Museum
 Indiana Theatre
 Indiana University–Purdue University Indianapolis (IUPUI)
 Indiana University–Purdue University Indianapolis Public Art Collection
 List of public art at Indiana University – Purdue University Indianapolis
 Indiana University Natatorium
 Indiana World War Memorial Military Museum
 Indiana World War Memorial Plaza
 Indianapolis 500
 Indianapolis Art Center
 Indianapolis Artsgarden
 Indianapolis Baroque Orchestra
 Indianapolis Catacombs
 Indianapolis Chamber Orchestra
 Indianapolis Cultural Districts
 Indianapolis Cultural Trail
 Indianapolis Early Music
 Indianapolis International Airport
 Indianapolis International Film Festival
 Indianapolis Jewish Film Festival
 Indianapolis Motor Speedway
 Indianapolis Motor Speedway Museum
 Indianapolis Museum of Art
 List of artworks at the Indianapolis Museum of Art
 List of outdoor artworks at Newfields
 Indianapolis Opera
 Indianapolis Public Library
 Indianapolis Symphony Orchestra
 Indianapolis Theatre Fringe Festival
 Indianapolis World Sports Park
 Indianapolis Youth Orchestra
 Indianapolis Zoo
 Indy Irish Festival
 Indy Jazz Fest
 Indy Legends Charity Pro–Am race
 Indy PopCon
 Indy Pride Festival
 International Violin Competition of Indianapolis
 Italian Street Festival

J
 James Whitcomb Riley Museum Home
 Jazz Kitchen
 Julia M. Carson Transit Center

K
 Kuntz Memorial Soccer Stadium
 Kurt Vonnegut Museum and Library

L

 Lafayette Square
 Landmark for Peace Memorial
 List of public art in Indianapolis
 List of parks in Indianapolis
 Long's Bakery
 Lucas Oil Stadium

M
 Madam Walker Legacy Center
 Major Taylor Velodrome
 Marian University
 Marion County Fair
 Market East (official cultural district)
 Martin University
 Mass Ave Cultural Arts District (official cultural district)
 Medal of Honor Memorial
 Melody Inn (nightclub)
 Michael A. Carroll Stadium
 Military Park
 Monon Trail
 Month of May
 Monumental Marathon
 Museum of 20th Century Warfare

N
 NCAA Hall of Champions
 NFL Scouting Combine
 NHRA U.S. Nationals
 National Register of Historic Places listings in Marion County, Indiana (Center Township)
 Nina Mason Pulliam Indianapolis Special Collections Room

O
 Oldfields, Lilly House and Gardens
 Old National Centre
 OneAmerica 500 Festival Mini-Marathon

P
 The Pavilion at Pan Am
 Pennzoil 150
 Phoenix Theatre
 Pleasant Run Greenway

Q

R
 Rhythm! Discovery Center
 Riverside Park

S

 Scottish Rite Cathedral
 Sidney & Lois Eskenazi Hospital
 Eskenazi Health Art Collection
 List of artworks in the Eskenazi Health Art Collection
 Skiles Test Nature Park
 Slippery Noodle Inn
 Soldiers' and Sailors' Monument
 Southeastway Park
 Southwestway Park
 St. Elmo Steak House
 Sun King Brewing Co.

T
 Town Run Trail Park

U
 Union Station
 University of Indianapolis
 University Park
 USS Indianapolis National Memorial

V
 Verizon 200 at the Brickyard
 Victory Field
 Virginia B. Fairbanks Art & Nature Park: 100 Acres

W
 Washington Square
 White River Gardens
 White River State Park (official cultural district)
 Wholesale District (official cultural district)

X

Y

Z

References

 
 
 
Indianapolis
Indiana, Indianapolis
In